Brand was a British literary magazine that published short stories, plays, poems and non-fiction. The magazine was first published in 2007. Each issue also featured an interview with a writer and art by contemporary artists. It folded in 2012.

Key staff
Playwright and short story writer Nina Rapi was the founding editor of BRAND. Poet, short story writer and art critic Cherry Smyth was the Poetry Editor of Brand.

Notable events
Brand was involved with various creative projects, launches, discussions and showcases. The magazine premiered a new Howard Barker play at The Purcell Rooms as part of the London Literature festival 2010. Brand also presented Brand shorts at the Royal Festival Hall, South Bank, London Literature Festival 2009; and organized events at the Rich Mix Centre, The Langly, Borders and Foyles bookstores. Brand  participated in panel discussions and/or offered masterclasses at The Newsroom, The Guardian, Westminster reference library and Foyles.

References

Defunct literary magazines published in the United Kingdom
Magazines published in London
Magazines established in 2007
Magazines disestablished in 2012